Jack the Radio is an indie roots rock band based in Raleigh, North Carolina.

In addition to gaining a strong regional following, the band has had success placing its music on TV shows both nationally and internationally. The band's singer, George Hage, has also been drawn into a Marvel Comic. Additionally, the band's most recent album, Badlands, inspired the creation of a craft beer, Badlands Black Rye IPA, released in October 2015 by the North Carolina-based Mystery Brewing Company.

Jack the Radio was founded by Hage and A.C. Hill in 2005 when they were roommates at North Carolina State University. They wrote songs together in their dorm rooms and recorded a self-titled EP.

The band added new members in 2009 and released their first full-length album, Pretty Money, in 2011. The band's second album, Lowcountry, came out in 2012. In 2014, the band won the regional competition known as Last Band Standing.

In 2015, Jack the Radio released its third studio album, Badlands. It features special appearances by Elizabeth Hopkins of Delta Rae and BJ Barham of American Aquarium. The online music site The Vinyl District called Badlands "a powerful mix of swampy, country rock and soaring, indie sensibilities," while the regional publication IndyWeek praised it as "one of the finest big-time rock records to come from the area in recent years."

Discography

Albums
 Pretty Money (2011)
 Lowcountry (2012)
 Live at Amplified Art / Devil in Here (2013)
 Badlands (2015)
 Creatures (2020)

In other media

Television
 "Carolina Mud" - HBO, Boardwalk Empire, Season 2 recap; USA Networks, Graceland, Season 2 Episode 8 
 "Pretty Money" - USA Networks, Necessary Roughness, Season 3 Episode 9   
 "Truck Stop Man" - Discovery Channel, Gator Boys, Season 2 commercial

Film
 "Downstream" - Where We're Meant to Be (2016)

Commercials
 Focus Home Interactive - video game trailer (2013)
 Squarespace - 60-second commercial (2013)
 Weber Grill Seasoning - 60-second commercial (2014)
 Kraftig Beer - 30-second commercial (2014)

References

External links
Jack the Radio

American blues rock musical groups
American country rock groups
Indie rock musical groups from North Carolina
Musical groups from Raleigh, North Carolina
Musical groups established in 2005
Musical groups from North Carolina